Laroque-Timbaut is a commune in the Lot-et-Garonne department in south-western France. The composer and organist Louis Raffy was born in Laroque-Timbaut. Laroque-Timbaut station has rail connections to Périgueux and Agen.

See also
Communes of the Lot-et-Garonne department

References

Laroquetimbaut